Fortunair Canada was a charter airline based Canada.

Code data 

IATA Code: FX
ICAO Code: FXE
Callsign: AIR FUTURE

History
Fortunair Canada was Canadian charter passengers airline which began operations in June 1993 created by former Nationair Director, M. Joseph Sandoux, (Civil Engineer) Founder and CEO ; using a Boeing 747-200 (manufactured around 1983) leased to own from Washington DC based aircraft lease company. Fortunair Canada flew every Thursday starting on 24 June 1993 from Toronto Canada to London and Glasgow and every Friday from Montreal to Paris and every Saturday from Montreal to Rome, with 485 passenger seats (25 first class and 460 economy).

Fleet details
 - Boeing 747-212B

See also 
 List of defunct airlines of Canada

References

External links
Code and fleet information

Defunct airlines of Canada
Defunct charter airlines
Airlines established in 1994
Airlines disestablished in 1995
Charter airlines of Canada
Canadian companies disestablished in 1995
Canadian companies established in 1994